Triumfetta rhomboidea, commonly known as diamond burbark or Chinese bur,  is a shrub that is extensively naturalised in tropical regions.
It is thought that to have come to Australia from China.  Its bark—sometimes called burbark--makes a kind of jute.

The taxon was first formally described in 1760 by botanist Nikolaus von Jacquin.

Description
Various sources give the number of stamens as being between 8 and 15.
The stems are covered in star-shaped (stellate) hairs.
Its embryology was described by Venkata Rao in 1952.

References

Grewioideae
Flora naturalised in Australia
Taxa named by Nikolaus Joseph von Jacquin